Cláudio João Danni (born 22 February 1942) is a Brazilian footballer. He played in five matches for the Brazil national football team in 1963. He was also part of Brazil's squad for the 1963 South American Championship.

References

External links
 

1942 births
Living people
Brazilian footballers
Brazil international footballers
Association football defenders
People from Canoas
Sportspeople from Rio Grande do Sul